The Secret of Dr. Kildare is a 1939 American film directed by Harold S. Bucquet and produced by Metro-Goldwyn-Mayer. This was the fourth of a total of ten Dr. Kildare pictures, Lew Ayres starred all but the first.

Plot summary
Dr. Leonard Gillespie (Lionel Barrymore), racing against time in his battle with melanoma, is about to start an important research project at Blair General Hospital to improve the use a Sulfa drug, Sulfapyridine, as a cure for pneumonia with the help of his assistant, Dr. James Kildare (Lew Ayres). Paul Messenger (Lionel Atwill), a Wall Street tycoon, asks for Gillespie's help in diagnosing the drastic, sudden personality changes that occur in his daughter Nancy (Helen Gilbert). Gillespie assigns Kildare to pose as an old friend of the family in order to observe Nancy. At the same time, Gillespie borrows an airplane to fly Kildare around the country collecting blood samples for Gillespie to examine around the clock.

When Gillespie collapses from exhaustion, Kildare forces the cranky old doctor to take a rest as a patient and persuades Blair head of hospital Dr. Carew (Walter Kingsford) to assign him to work full-time on the Messenger case. Kildare's move forces Gillespie to put the project on hold, and while the old doctor goes fishing on a much needed vacation, Kildare, still hiding his identity as a doctor, begins to investigate the causes of Nancy's symptoms. He learns that Nancy's symptoms began to appear when she feared she had lost the love of her fiancé.

While talking with Nora (Sara Haden), the family housekeeper, Kildare learns that Nancy suffers blinding headaches. Nora, who disdains all doctors because of their inability to help Nancy's mother, has convinced Nancy that she is suffering from the same type of brain tumor that killed her mother. Nora takes Nancy to see a nature healer named John Xerxes Archley (Grant Mitchell), which prompts Kildare to admit that he is a doctor and dispute Archley's diagnosis of a "brain tumor" but alienates him from the family. With the help of ambulance driver Joe Wayman (Nat Pendleton) and his trusty monkey wrench, Kildare gets access to Nancy, who now has hysterical blindness.

Kildare tries to consult with the vacationing Gillespie over the girl's symptoms but is rebuffed. Gillespie returns to Blair ostensibly to give a lecture to the interns on treating psychosomatic symptoms. Following Gillespie's advice, Kildare pretends to operate on Nancy's eyes and arranges for the first person she sees afterwards to be her fiancé, thus curing her hysterical blindness. Meanwhile, Gillespie returns from his vacation revived, and realizing that Kildare quit the experiment only out of concern for his health, reconciles with his assistant. Together they embark again on their research into curing pneumonia.

Cast

Censorship
The censors at the Hays Office requested changes to the script's discussions of pregnancy before they would approve it for production. One of the major issues they had with the script was that it explicitly included dialogue about the potential dangers of childbirth.

See also

 Lionel Barrymore filmography

References

External links
 
 
 
 
 

1939 films
1939 drama films
American black-and-white films
American drama films
Films directed by Harold S. Bucquet
Films set in New York City
Films set in hospitals
Metro-Goldwyn-Mayer films
1930s English-language films
1930s American films